Poricellariidae is a family of bryozoans belonging to the order Cheilostomatida.

Genera:
 Diplodidymia Reuss, 1869
 Poricellaria d'Orbigny, 1854

References

Cheilostomatida